The 2010 Open de Rennes was a professional tennis tournament played on hard courts. It was the fifth edition of the tournament which was part of the 2010 ATP Challenger Tour. It took place in Rennes, France between 12 and 17 October 2010.

ATP entrants

Seeds

 Rankings are as of October 4, 2010.

Other entrants
The following players received wildcards into the singles main draw:
  Charles-Antoine Brézac
  Romain Jouan
  Laurent Rochette
  Kristof Vliegen

The following players received entry as a Special Exempt into the singles main draw:
  Augustin Gensse

The following players received entry from the qualifying draw:
  Matthias Bachinger
  Reda El Amrani
  Pierre-Hugues Herbert
  Henri Kontinen

Champions

Singles

 Marc Gicquel def.  Stéphane Bohli, 7–6(8–6), 4–6, 6–1

Doubles

 Scott Lipsky /  David Martin def.  Denis Gremelmayr /  Björn Phau, 6–4, 5–7, [12–10]

External links
Official website
ITF Search 
ATP official site

Open de Rennes
Open de Rennes
2010 in French tennis